"Night Call" is a 1964 episode of the American television anthology series The Twilight Zone directed by Jacques Tourneur. The story follows an elderly woman, played by Gladys Cooper, who receives persistent disturbing phone calls from an anonymous caller. It is based on Richard Matheson's 1961 short story, "Long Distance Call", although it ends much differently.

Opening narration

Plot
An elderly woman, Elva Keene, receives strange anonymous phone calls in the middle of a stormy night. During the first calls she hears only static. Later she hears a man moaning and she repeatedly demands to know who is calling. The man continues to call and keeps repeating "Hello?" over and over. Finally he says, "Hello? Where are you? I want to talk to you." Elva, terrified, screams at the man to leave her alone.

The phone company traces the calls to a telephone line that has fallen in a cemetery.

Elva and her housekeeper, who believes the calls are the result of a bad connection, visit the cemetery where she finds that the line is resting on the grave of her long-deceased fiancé, Brian Douglas. Elva says that she always insisted on having her own way, and Brian always did what she said. Brian died a week before they were to be married. That day, she insisted on driving, lost control of the car and hit a tree. The accident crippled her and caused Brian to fly through the windshield, killing him.

Now that she can talk to him again, she won't have to be alone. At home, she picks up the phone and calls to Brian's ghost, pleading with him to answer. He replies that she told him to leave her alone and that he always does what she says. Then the line goes dead, leaving Elva alone and crying in her bed.

Closing narration

Notes
The original short story ends when Elva Keene finds out the call is coming from the cemetery. The caller is never identified; instead, the story ends the following night, when the phone rings and she answers. The voice says: "Hello, Mrs. Keene. I'll be right over."

The premiere of "Night Call" was scheduled for Friday, November 22, 1963. Hours before it was to air, however, President John F. Kennedy was assassinated in Dallas, Texas. It was rescheduled, as were all of the other network shows. "Night Call" finally premiered on February 7, 1964.

References

DeVoe, Bill. (2008). Trivia from The Twilight Zone. Albany, GA: Bear Manor Media. 
Grams, Martin. (2008). The Twilight Zone: Unlocking the Door to a Television Classic. Churchville, MD: OTR Publishing. 
Zicree, Marc Scott: The Twilight Zone Companion.  Sillman-James Press, 1982 (second edition)

External links

An urban legend that may have inspired Matheson's story

1964 American television episodes
Adaptations of works by Richard Matheson
Television episodes written by Richard Matheson
Television shows based on short fiction
The Twilight Zone (1959 TV series season 5) episodes
Television episodes set in Maine
Telephony in popular culture